The 2012 Moscow shooting was an incident on 7 November 2012, in which six people were killed and one person injured by a lone gunman at a warehouse in northeast Moscow, Russia.

The attack
Five people were killed in a shooting spree in northeast Moscow in Russia. Hours before the shooting, Dmitry Vinogradov posted his hatred towards mankind on one of Russia's top social networks, Vkontakte. The gunman entered the warehouse on Chermanskaya Street at around 10:00 a.m. on Wednesday, 7 November 2012, dressed in camouflage gear and armed with two semiautomatic shotguns, a Saiga 12 variant and a Benelli M3 Super 90. He shot dead three men and two women, injuring two others, a male and female, at their desks before giving himself up to security guards. One of the injured died during the night while in intensive care, having suffered from critical gunshot wounds. Vinogradov's girlfriend was said to be safe.

Perpetrator

Police arrested 29-year-old Dmitry Vinogradov, a lawyer at the Rigla pharmaceutical company that owned the warehouse. He was reported to have gone on a five-day drinking binge after being jilted by a co-worker. On 8 November, Vinogradav apologized in court and pleaded that he had "no other choice". He also said that he had wanted to kill himself after the massacre, but was prevented from doing so. An investigator said that Vinogradov had been planning the shooting spree since January. Vinogradov believed killing as many things related to humans was the only way to make the world better. Vinogradov was captured on security cameras moments before the shooting began. Vinogradov was sentenced to life imprisonment on 9 September 2013 and was ordered to pay $300,000 to victims' families for damages, as well as being fined $9,000 for publishing his manifesto.

See also
2007 Balashikha shooting
2013 Belgorod shooting
1992 Tatarstan shooting

References

21st-century mass murder in Russia
Attacks in Russia in 2012
2012 murders in Russia
Mass murder in 2012
2012 in Moscow
Mass shootings in Russia
Deaths by firearm in Russia
Murder in Moscow
November 2012 crimes
2012 mass shootings in Europe
Filmed killings